Francisco Polti Santillán (November 17, 1938) is a prelate of the Roman Catholic Church. He served as bishop of Santo Tomé from 1994 until 2006, and as bishop of Santiago del Estero from 2006 until his retirement in 2013.

Life 
Born in Santiago del Estero, Polti Santillán became a member of Opus Dei. He was ordained to the priesthood on August 11, 1963.

On July 13, 1994, he was appointed bishop of Santo Tomé. Polti Santillán received his episcopal consecration on the following August 22 from Antonio Quarracino, archbishop of Buenos Aires, with archbishop of Santa Fe de la Vera Cruz, Edgardo Gabriel Storni, archbishop emeritus of Corrientes, Fortunato Antonio Rossi, archbishop of Corrientes, Domingo Salvador Castagna, and bishop of Posadas, Alfonso Delgado Evers, serving as co-consecrators. He was installed on the following September 11.

On May 17, 2006, he was appointed bishop of Santiago del Estero, where he was installed on the following July 22. He resigned on December 23, 2013, when he reached the age of 75 year, the age of retirement for bishops.

External links 
 catholic-hierarchy.org, Bishop Francisco Polti Santillán

1938 births
20th-century Roman Catholic bishops in Argentina
21st-century Roman Catholic bishops in Argentina
Living people
Roman Catholic bishops of Santo Tomé
Roman Catholic bishops of Santiago del Estero